Nam Pat Wildlife Sanctuary is a wildlife sanctuary in Ban Khok, Fak Tha and Nam Pat districts of Thailand's Uttaradit Province.

Geography
Nam Pat rises to the west, a major branch of the Nan River.

Topography
Landscape is covered by forested mountains, such as Khao Daen , Phu Hut , Phu Luang  and Phu Nong Don . The area is divided into 38% high slope mountain area (shallow valleys, mountain tops, upper slopes and deeply incised streams), 58% hill slope area (open slopes, midslope ridges and u-shaped valleys) and 4% plains.

Flora
The sanctuary features mixed deciduous forest (64%), dry deciduous forest (29%), dry evergreen forest (3%), agricultural area (2%), abandoned farms (1%) and degraded forest (1%).

Fauna

Mammals in the sanctuary are:

Birds, of which passerine species:

and non-passerine species:

Reptiles in the sanctuary are:

Location

See also
 List of protected areas of Thailand
 List of Protected Areas Regional Offices of Thailand

References

Wildlife sanctuaries of Thailand
Geography of Uttaradit province
Tourist attractions in Uttaradit province
2001 establishments in Thailand
Protected areas established in 2001